The subarctic climate (also called subpolar climate, or boreal climate) is a continental climate with long, cold (often very cold) winters, and short, warm to cool summers. It is found on large landmasses, often away from the moderating effects of an ocean, generally at latitudes from 50° to 70°N, poleward of the humid continental climates. Subarctic or boreal climates are the source regions for the cold air that affects temperate latitudes to the south in winter. These climates represent Köppen climate classification Dfc, Dwc, Dsc, Dfd, Dwd and  Dsd.

Description
This type of climate offers some of the most extreme seasonal temperature variations found on the planet: in winter, temperatures can drop to below  and in summer, the temperature may exceed . However, the summers are short; no more than three months of the year (but at least one month) must have a 24-hour average temperature of at least  to fall into this category of climate, and the coldest month should average below  (or ). Record low temperatures can approach .
 
With 5–7 consecutive months when the average temperature is below freezing, all moisture in the soil and subsoil freezes solidly to depths of many feet. Summer warmth is insufficient to thaw more than a few surface feet, so permafrost prevails under most areas not near the southern boundary of this climate zone. Some northern areas with subarctic climates located near oceans (southern Alaska, the northern fringe of Europe, Sakhalin Oblast and Kamchatka Oblast), have milder winters and no permafrost, and are more suited for farming unless precipitation is excessive. The frost-free season is very short, varying from about 45 to 100 days at most, and a freeze can occur anytime outside the summer months in many areas.

Description
The first D indicates continentality, with the coldest month below  (or ).

The second letter denotes precipitation patterns:
 s: A dry summer—the driest month in the high-sun half of the year (April to September in the Northern Hemisphere, October to March in the Southern Hemisphere) has less than / of rainfall and has exactly or less than  the precipitation of the wettest month in the low-sun half of the year (October to March in the Northern Hemisphere, April to September in the Southern Hemisphere),
 w: A dry winter—the driest month in the low-sun half of the year has exactly or less than one‑tenth of the precipitation found in the wettest month in the summer half of the year,
 f: No dry season—does not meet either of the alternative specifications above; precipitation and humidity are often high year-round.

The third letter denotes temperature:
 d: Severely cold subarctic, only 1–3 months above , coldest month at or below .

Precipitation
Away from the coasts, precipitation occurs mostly in the summer months, while in coastal areas with subarctic climates the heaviest precipitation is usually during the autumn months when the relative warmth of sea vis-à-vis land is greatest. Low precipitation, by the standards of more temperate regions with longer summers and warmer winters, is typically sufficient in view of the very low evapotranspiration to allow a water-logged terrain in many areas of subarctic climate and to permit snow cover during winter.

A notable exception to this pattern is that subarctic climates occurring at high elevations in otherwise temperate regions have extremely high precipitation due to orographic lift.

Vegetation and land use
Vegetation in regions with subarctic climates is generally of low diversity, as only hardy tree species can survive the long winters and make use of the short summers. Trees are mostly limited to conifers, as few broadleaved trees are able to survive the very low temperatures in winter. This type of forest is also known as taiga, a term which is sometimes applied to the climate found therein as well. Even though the diversity may be low, the area and numbers are high, and the taiga (boreal) forest is the largest forest biome on the planet, with most of the forests located in Russia and Canada. The process by which plants become acclimated to cold temperatures is called hardening.

Agricultural potential is generally poor, due to the natural infertility of soils and the prevalence of swamps and lakes left by departing ice sheets, and short growing seasons prohibit all but the hardiest of crops. Despite the short season, the long summer days at such latitudes do permit some agriculture. In some areas, ice has scoured rock surfaces bare, entirely stripping off the overburden. Elsewhere, rock basins have been formed and stream courses dammed, creating countless lakes.

Distribution

Dfc and Dfd distribution
The Dfc climate, by far the most common subarctic type, is found in the following areas:

Northern Eurasia
The majority of Siberia
The Kamchatka Peninsula and the northern and central parts of the Kuril Islands and Sakhalin Island
The northern half of Fennoscandia (milder winters in coastal areas) and higher elevations further south.  
Central Romania
Some parts of central Germany
The Tatra Mountains in Poland and Slovakia, above .
The Pyrenees, between 
The Northeastern Anatolia Region and the Pontic Alps, between 
Mountain summits in Scotland, most notably in the Cairngorms and the Nevis Range
The far northeast of Turkey, including Sarıkamış.

North America
Most of Interior, Western and Southcentral Alaska
The high Rocky Mountains in Colorado, Wyoming, Idaho, Utah, Montana and the White Mountains of New Hampshire
Much of Canada from about 53–55°N to the tree line, including:
Southern Labrador
Certain areas within Newfoundland interior and along its northern coast
Quebec: Jamésie, Côte-Nord and far southern Nunavik
Far northern Ontario
The northern Prairie Provinces
The Rocky Mountain Foothills in Alberta and British Columbia
Most of the Yukon
Most of the Northwest Territories
 Southwestern Nunavut

This creates Dfd climates, which are mostly found in the Sakha Republic:
Yakutsk
Oymyakon
Verkhoyansk

Dsc and Dsd distribution
Climates classified as Dsc or Dsd, with a dry summer, are rare, occurring in very small areas at high elevation around the Mediterranean Basin, Iran, Kyrgyzstan, Afghanistan, Tajikistan, Alaska and other parts of the northwestern United States (Eastern Washington, Eastern Oregon, Southern Idaho, California's Eastern Sierra), the Russian Far East, Seneca, Oregon, and Atlin, British Columbia. Turkey is an exception with it being common in Northeast Anatolia and in the Taurus and Köroğlu Mountains.

Dwc and Dwd distribution

The Dwc climate can be found in:
Much of northern Mongolia
Russia:
Most of Khabarovsk Krai except the south
Southeastern Sakha Republic
Southern Magadan Oblast
Northern Amur Oblast
Northern Buryatia
Zabaykalsky Krai
Irkutsk Oblast
China:
Tahe County and Mohe County in Heilongjiang
Northern Hulunbuir in Inner Mongolia
Gannan in Gansu (due to extreme elevation)
Huangnan, eastern Hainan and eastern Guoluo in Qinghai (due to extreme elevation)
Most of Garzê and Ngawa Autonomous Prefectures (due to extreme elevation) in Sichuan
Most of Qamdo Prefecture (due to extreme elevation) in the Tibet Autonomous Region
 Parts of Ladakh (including Siachen Glacier) and Spiti regions of India
 Parts of Kaema Plateau (including Mount Baekdu, Samjiyon, Musan) in North Korea

Southward, this climate grades into the humid continental climates with longer summers (and usually less-severe winters) allowing broadleaf trees; in a few locations close to a temperate sea (as in northern Norway and southern Alaska), this climate can grade into a short-summer version of an oceanic climate, the subpolar oceanic climate, as the sea is approached. In China and Mongolia, as one moves southwestwards or towards lower elevations, temperatures increase but precipitation is so low that the subarctic climate grades into a cold semi-arid climate.

Charts of selected sites

See also
Boreal ecology
Köppen climate classification
Subantarctic
Taiga

References

Köppen climate types
Climate of North America
Climate of Europe
Climate of Asia
Ecology
Subarctic